The Organization for Ethical Source (OES) is a non-profit organization founded by Coraline Ada Ehmke in December 2020, to support the ethical source movement, which promotes that "software freedom must always be in service of human freedom". The organization is dedicated to "giving technologists tools and resources to ensure that their work is being used for social good and to minimize harm". It develops tools to "promote fair, ethical, and pro-social outcomes for those who contribute to, or are affected by, open source technologies".

The organization aims to support the ethical source movement, promoting ethics and social responsibility in open source. The movement has facilitated a new kind of license, the Hippocratic License, inspired by the medical Hippocratic Oath. The license has been criticized as non-enforceable and non-open source, including by Bruce Perens, co-founder of the Open Source Initiative and author of the Open Source Definition. The license has triggered debate within the open source movement. The Hippocratic License has been classified as non-free by the Free Software Foundation, while the Open Source Initiative stated, on Twitter, that the license is not an  open source software license and that software distributed under such license is not open source.

During the 2021 controversy around Richard Stallman returning to the FSF board, after his resignation in 2019, the OES issued a statement against it, and was one of the signatory organizations of an open letter with thousands of signatures.

See also

 Inclusive language
 Open source movement
 Women in Computing

References

External links
 

Free and open-source software organizations
Organizations established in 2020
Non-profit technology
Intellectual property activism
Digital rights organizations
Charities based in Switzerland